Weirdon is the fifth studio album by Purling Hiss, released on September 23, 2014 by Drag City.

Track listing

Personnel
Adapted from the Weirdon liner notes.

Purling Hiss
 Kiel Everett – bass guitar, acoustic guitar
 Ben Leaphart – drums
 Mike Polizze – vocals, electric guitar, acoustic guitar, bass guitar, drums, percussion, production, cover art

Production and additional personnel
 Jason Killinger – cover art
 Jason Meagher – production, photography
 Roger Seibel – mastering
 Tiffany Yoon – photography

Release history

References

External links 
 

2014 albums
Purling Hiss albums
Drag City (record label) albums